Puebla is a station on the Mexico City Metro. It is located in the Puebla district of the Iztacalco delegation of Mexico City; both the area it is located in and the station are named for the nearby city of Puebla. The station logo represents some angels, as the city is commonly called The City of Angels.

The station is elevated and has two entrances on opposite sides of the avenue. Street vendors occupy the areas around the station entrances and a bus depot is underneath the Metro Line. Puebla is often used by commuters wishing to cross the city from the east, who wish to avoid the relative overcrowding of the terminal station Pantitlán.

Ridership

See also 
 Autódromo Hermanos Rodríguez – nearby

References

External links
 

Puebla
Railway stations opened in 1987
1987 establishments in Mexico
Mexico City Metro stations in Iztacalco
Accessible Mexico City Metro stations